

Herbert Loch (5 August 1886 – 28 October 1976) was a German general in the Wehrmacht during World War II who commanded the XXVIII Corps and the 18th Army. He was a recipient of the Knight's Cross of the Iron Cross of Nazi Germany.

Awards and decorations

 Knight's Cross of the Iron Cross on  16 June 1940 as Generalleutnant and commander of 17. Infanterie-Division

References

Citations

Bibliography

 

1886 births
1976 deaths
German Army generals of World War II
Generals of Artillery (Wehrmacht)
German Army personnel of World War I
Recipients of the clasp to the Iron Cross, 1st class
Recipients of the Gold German Cross
Recipients of the Knight's Cross of the Iron Cross
German prisoners of war in World War II held by the United States
People from Birkenfeld (district)
People from the Rhine Province
Military personnel from Rhineland-Palatinate